Jonathan Erlich and Andy Ram were the defending champions and successfully defended their title, defeating Jonas Björkman and Radek Štěpánek 7–6(7–2), 6–2 in the final.

Seeds

Draw

Draw

External links
Main Draw

 

Doubles
2004 ATP Tour